Leslie Christidis (born 30 May 1959), also simply known as Les Christidis, is an Australian ornithologist. His main research field is the evolution and systematics of birds. He has been director of Southern Cross University National Marine Science Centre since 2009. He was assistant director at Sydney's Australian Museum from 2004 to 2009.

Leslie Christidis graduated as Bachelor of Science at the University of Melbourne in 1980. In 1985 he required his Ph.D. at the Australian National University where he studied the evolutionary genetics of Australian finches.

During his research studies, where he first worked as a CSIRO post-doctoral fellow and then as the recipient of Queen Elizabeth II fellowship, he demonstrated that 4500 species of the world's songbirds had its origin in Australia. Les Christidis was Senior Curator of Ornithology at the Museum Victoria from 1987 to 1996.

Les Christidis was author or co-author of over 100 scientific papers and books on the taxonomy and evolutionary genetics of birds, bats, marsupials, bryozoans and more recently on cultural intangible heritage. Together with Walter E. Boles he published The Taxonomy and Species of Birds of Australia and Its Territories, with several revisions on Australasian birds including the family Acanthizidae. Together with Richard Schodde he described Amytornis barbatus diamantina, a subspecies of the grey grasswren, in 1987. He further described two subfamilies, Amalocichlinae and Pachycephalopsinae, and a genus, Cryptomicroeca in 2012.

He was awarded with the W. Roy Wheeler Medallion in 2005.

Selected works
Les Christidis, Walter Boles: The Taxonomy and Species of Birds of Australia and Its Territories. Royal Australasian Ornithologists Union, 1994. 
Les Christidis, Walter Boles: Systematics and Taxonomy of Australian Birds. CSIRO Publishing. 2008.

References

External links
Australian Bird List (compiled on basis of The Taxonomy and Species of Birds of Australia and its Territories by Boles/Christidis (1994))

1959 births
Australian ornithologists
Australian curators
University of Melbourne alumni
Australian National University alumni
Living people